A griffin is a mythological creature with the body of a lion and head and wings of an eagle.

Griffin(s) or The Griffin(s) may also refer to:

Arts and entertainment

Fictional characters

 Griffin (The Invisible Man), the title character in H. G. Wells' novel
 Griffin (comics), several comic book characters
 Griffin, in the Australian-New Zealand film The Navigator: A Medieval Odyssey
 Griffin Callenreese, in the Japanese manga and anime series Banana Fish
 Griffin Castillo, in the American television soap opera All My Children
 Griffin Pierce-Taylor, in the Canadian television series Degrassi: The Next Generation
 Griffin Moss, one of the main characters of The Griffin and Sabine Saga
 Griffin emblem of Midland Bank, later used as a character in advertisements for the bank

Other uses in arts and entertainment
 Griffin Poetry Prize, a Canadian poetry award
 "The Griffin" (fairy tale), a German fairy tale collected by the Brothers Grimm
 The Griffin, the undergraduate student magazine of Downing College, Cambridge, England
 The Griffin, the annual literary journal of Gwynedd Mercy University, Pennsylvania, U.S.
 Griffin Theatre Company, in Sydney, Australia

Businesses and organisations

Education
 Griffin College, in Seattle, Washington, U.S., 1909–1993
 Griffin Elementary School, in Lakeland, Florida, U.S.
 Griffin High School (Georgia), U.S.
 Griffin School District, Washington, U.S.
 Griffin Technical College, Griffin, Georgia, U.S.

Other businesses and organisations
 Griffin Communications, an American media company 
 Griffin Hospital, Derby, Connecticut, U.S.

 Griffin Investigations, an American private investigation firm
 Griffin Music, a Canadian independent record label
 Griffin's Foods, a New Zealand-based food company

 The Griffins Hotel, Adelaide, South Australia

Military

 Heinkel He 177 Greif (German, 'griffin'), a World War II German heavy bomber
 Bell Griffin, a helicopter 
 Saab JAS 39 Gripen ('Griffin'), a Swedish fighter aircraft
 AGM-176 Griffin, a precision-guided munition by Raytheon
 No. 9 Squadron (Pakistan Air Force), named The Griffins
 Griffin LGB, an Israeli laser guided bomb system
 Griffin, a variant of the ASCOD armoured fighting vehicle

People
 Griffin (given name), including a list of people with the name
 Griffin (surname), including a list of people and fictional characters with the name
 House of Griffin or Griffin dynasty, a dynasty ruling the Duchy of Pomerania from the 12th century until 1637

Places

Canada
 Rural Municipality of Griffin No. 66, Saskatchewan
 Griffin, Saskatchewan
 Griffin Inlet, Nunavut

United States
 Griffin Township, Pope County, Arkansas
 Griffin, Georgia
 Griffin, Illinois
 Griffin, Indiana
 Griffin, Missouri
 Griffin, former name of Sharps, Virginia
 Griffin Bay State Park, Washington
 Griffin Island, a mountain in Massachusetts
 Fort Griffin, Texas
 Lake Griffin State Park, Florida

Other countries
 Griffin, Queensland, a suburb in the Moreton Bay Region, Australia
 Griffin Cove, South Shetland Islands, Antarctica
 Griffin Nunatak, Oates Land, Antarctica
 Mount Griffin, Victoria Land, Antarctica
 4995 Griffin, an asteroid

Ships
 Griffin (ship), a 17th-century English sailing ship in British America
 Griffin (1807 ship), a prize that made one voyage as a whaler
 Gribshunden or Griffen ('Griffin'), a 15th-century Danish warship
 HMS Griffin, several ships of the Royal Navy
 Hired armed cutter Griffin, two Royal Navy vessels
 Le Griffon ('The Griffin'), a 17th-century French ship
 , a U.S. Navy submarine tender during World War II

Sports
 Grand Rapids Griffins, an American hockey team
 Griffin (esports), a South Korean professional esports team
 Griffin (mascot), the College of William & Mary's official mascot
 Griffin, the mascot of Grossmont College, California, U.S.
 Kotka Griffins, a Finnish rugby union team

Other uses
 Griffin beaker, a "low-form" glass beaker 
 Griffin (processor), an AMD microprocessor
 Project Griffin, a counter-terrorism project 
 The Griffin, Monmouth, Wales, a public house

See also

 Griff (disambiguation)
 Griffin Creek (disambiguation)
 Griffin House (disambiguation)
 Griffin Inn (disambiguation)
 Griffin Stadium (disambiguation)
 Griffon (disambiguation)
 Gryffin, stage name of American musician Dan Griffith
 Gryphon (disambiguation)
 Justice Griffin (disambiguation)